Bastilla cuneilineata is a moth of the family Noctuidae first described by Warren in 1915. It is found in New Caledonia, the Loyalty Islands and Vanuatu.

References

External links
Holloway, J. D. & Miller, Scott E. (2003). "The composition, generic placement and host-plant relationships of the joviana-group in the Parallelia generic complex". Invertebrate Systematics. 17: 111–128.

Bastilla (moth)
Moths described in 1915